Michael Woods II (born March 19, 2000) is an American football wide receiver for the Cleveland Browns of the National Football League (NFL). He played college football at Arkansas and Oklahoma.

Early life and high school
Woods grew up in Magnolia, Texas and attended Magnolia High School. He caught 155 passes for 2,988 yards and 41 touchdowns in three varsity seasons at Magnolia. Woods was rated a three-star recruit and initially committed to play college football at SMU. He later decommitted and signed to play at Arkansas after SMU coach Chad Morris was hired by the school.

College career
Woods began his college career at Arkansas. He started seven games had 18 receptions for 206 yards and one touchdown as a freshman. Woods gained 423 receiving yards while leading the team with 33 catches and four touchdown receptions in his sophomore season. As a junior, he caught 32 passes for 619 yards and five touchdowns. Woods entered the NCAA transfer portal in April during his junior year.

Woods ultimately transferred to Oklahoma. He played in 11 games during the 2021 season and caught 35 passes for 400 yards and two touchdowns. Following the end of the season Woods declared that he would be entering the 2022 NFL Draft.

Professional career

Woods was selected in the sixth round with the 202nd overall pick in the 2022 NFL Draft by the Cleveland Browns.

Personal life
Woods is the nephew of Dianne Durham, the first Black gymnast to win the USA All-around championship in 1983.

References

External links
 Cleveland Browns bio
Arkansas Razorbacks bio
Oklahoma Sooners bio

Living people
Oklahoma Sooners football players
People from Magnolia, Texas
Players of American football from Texas
Sportspeople from the Houston metropolitan area
2000 births
Arkansas Razorbacks football players
American football wide receivers
Cleveland Browns players